Lisa Ann Coole (1975 – May 16, 1998)  was a 1997 graduate of the University of Georgia who was named the NCAA Woman of the Year Award for 1997 and was also awarded the Today's Top VIII Award as a member of the Class of 1998.  She won two NCAA titles and 19 All-America honors making her the most-decorated swimmer in UGA history.

Coole was killed in an automobile accident on May 16, 1998, in Champaign, Illinois at the age of 23.  She was enrolled in veterinary school at the University of Illinois and was on her way to adopt a greyhound at the time of her death. She was inducted posthumously into the University of Georgia Circle of Honor in 1999.

Sources
Georgia Magazine September 1998: Vol. 77, No. 4
The University of Georgia Columns 1 June 1998
NCAA Woman of the Year profile
 

1975 births
1998 deaths
American female swimmers
Georgia Bulldogs women's swimmers
Universiade medalists in swimming
Road incident deaths in Illinois
Universiade gold medalists for the United States
Medalists at the 1995 Summer Universiade
20th-century American women
20th-century American people